Avenue of Poplars in Autumn is an oil painting created in 1884 by Vincent van Gogh.

In October 1884 Van Gogh described Avenue of Poplars in Autumn to his brother Theo, "The last thing I made is a rather large study of an avenue of poplars, with yellow autumn leaves, the sun casting, here and there, sparkling spots on the fallen leaves on the ground, alternating with the long shadows of the stems. At the end of the road is a small cottage, and over it all the blue sky through the autumn leaves."

See also
 List of works by Vincent van Gogh

References

External links 
 

Paintings by Vincent van Gogh
Paintings of the Netherlands by Vincent van Gogh
1884 paintings